Empire of Sin may refer to:

 Empire of Sin (video game), a 2020 video game
 Empire of Sin: A Story of Sex, Jazz, Murder, and the Battle for Modern New Orleans, a 2014 book
 Sins of Empire, a 2017 book